Tommaso Lorenzetti (born 22 June 1985) is an Italian motorcycle racer and Maxillofacial surgeon.

Career statistics

Grand Prix motorcycle racing

By season

Races by year

External links

Italian motorcycle racers
Living people
1985 births
Moto2 World Championship riders
FIM Superstock 1000 Cup riders
People from Foligno
Cyclists from Umbria